The Tunisian records in swimming are the fastest ever performances of swimmers from Tunisia, which are recognised and ratified by the Federation Tunisienne de Natation (FTN).

All records were set in finals unless noted otherwise.

Long Course (50 m)

Men

Women

Mixed relay

Short Course (25 m)

Men

Women

References

External links
 FTN web site

Tunisia
Records
Swimming
Swimming